The National Cooperative Highway Research Program (NCHRP) conducts research in problem areas that affect highway planning, design, construction, operation, and maintenance in the United States. Spearheaded by the Transportation Research Board (TRB), part of the National Academies of Sciences Engineering and Medicine, it is jointly supported by federal agencies, state departments of transportation, and other nonprofit organizations.

Funding
The National Cooperative Highway Research Program was established in 1962 under TRB with a view to promoting research on serious problems related to the highway. It is sponsored by American Association of State Highway and Transportation Officials (AASHTO) and the U.S. Department of Transportation's Federal Highway Administration (FHWA). This program is funded by all the state highway and transportation departments. State departments of transportation are requested to contribute 5.5% of their State Planning and Research (SP&R) funds each year. Annual NCHRP funding has been approximately $37 million in recent years.

FHWA provides the funds to the NCHRP through a cooperative agreement with the National Academy of Sciences, the parent organization of the Transportation Research Board.

Examples

Projects
Examples of research projects previously approved by NCHRP include:

Reports
Examples of final NCHRP reports include:

A comprehensive list of NCHRP reports by publication date can be found on the TRB website.

References 

Transportation in the United States